The Seljuk dynasty, or Seljukids (Saljuqian, alternatively spelled as Seljuqs or Saljuqs), also known as Seljuk Turks, Seljuk Turkomans or the Saljuqids, was an Oghuz Turkic, Sunni Muslim dynasty that gradually became Persianate and contributed to the Turco-Persian tradition in the medieval Middle East and Central Asia. The Seljuks established the Seljuk Empire (1037–1194), the Sultanate of Kermân (1041–1186) and the Sultanate of Rum (1074–1308), which at their heights stretched from Iran to Anatolia and were the prime targets of the First Crusade.

Early history
The Seljuks originated from the Kinik branch of the Oghuz Turks, who in the 8th century lived on the periphery of the Muslim world, north of the Caspian Sea and Aral Sea in their Oghuz Yabgu State, in the Kazakh Steppe of Turkestan. During the 10th century, Oghuz had come into close contact with Muslim cities.

When Seljuk, the leader of the Seljuk clan, had a falling out with Yabghu, the supreme chieftain of the Oghuz, he split his clan off from the bulk of the Oghuz Turks and set up camp on the west bank of the lower Syr Darya. Around 985, Seljuk converted to Islam. In the 11th century the Seljuks migrated from their ancestral homelands into mainland Persia, in the province of Khurasan, where they encountered the Ghaznavids. The Seljuks defeated the Ghaznavids at the Battle of Nasa Plains in 1035. Seljuk's grandsons, Tughril and Chaghri, received the insignias of governor, grants of land, and were given the title of dehqan. At the Battle of Dandanaqan they defeated a Ghaznavid army, and after a successful siege of Isfahan by Tughril in 1050/51, established the Great Seljuk Empire. The Seljuks mixed with the local population and adopted the Persian culture and Persian language in the following decades.

Later period
After arriving in Persia, the Seljuks adopted the Persian culture and used the Persian language as the official language of the government, and played an important role in the development of the Turko-Persian tradition which features "Persian culture patronized by Turkic rulers". Today, they are remembered as great patrons of Persian culture, art, literature, and language.

Seljuk rulers

Rulers of the Seljuk Dynasty
The "Great Seljuks" were heads of the family; in theory their authority extended over all the other Seljuk lines, although in practice this often was not the case. Turkic custom called for the senior member of the family to be the Great Seljuk, although usually the position was associated with the ruler of western Persia.

 Muhammad's son Mahmud II succeeded him in western Persia, but Ahmad Sanjar, who was the governor of Khurasan at the time being the senior member of the family, became the Great Seljuk Sultan.

Seljuk sultans of Hamadan

The rulers of western Persia, who maintained a very loose grip on the Abbasids of Baghdad. Several Turkic emirs gained a strong level of influence in the region, such as the Eldiduzids.
 Mahmud II 1118–1131
 1131–1133 disputed between:
 Dawud 1131–1132
 Mas'ud (in Jibal and Iranian Azerbaijan) 1132
 Toghrul II, 1132–1133
 Mas'ud 1133–1152
 Malik Shah III 1152–1153
 Muhammad II 1153–1159
 Suleiman-Shah 1159–1161
 Arslan Shah (Arslan II) 1161–1177
 Toghrul III 1177–1194

In 1194, Toghrul III was killed in battle with the Khwarezm Shah, who annexed Hamadan.

Seljuk rulers of Kerman

Kerman was a province in southern Persia. Between 1053 and 1154, the territory also included Umman.
 Qawurd 1041–1073 (great-grantson of Seljuq, brother of Alp Arslan)
 Kerman Shah 1073–1074
 Sultan Shah 1074–1075 or 1074–1085
 Hussain Omar 1075–1084
or 1074 (before Sultan Shah)
 Turan Shah I 1084–1096 or 1085–1097
 Iranshah ibn Turanshah 1096–1101 or 1097–1101
 Arslan Shah I 1101–1142
 Muhammad I 1142–1156
 Tuğrul Shah 1156–1169 or 1156–1170
 Bahram-Shah 1169–1174 or 1170–1175
 Arslan Shah II 1174–1176 or 1175–1176
 Turan Shah II 1176–1183
 Muhammad II Shah 1183–1187 or 1183–1186
Muhammad abandoned Kerman, which fell into the hands of the Oghuz chief Malik Dinar. Kerman was eventually annexed by the Khwarezmid Empire in 1196.

Seljuk rulers in Syria
 Abu Sa'id Taj ad-Dawla Tutush I 1085–1086
 Jalal ad-Dawlah Malik Shah I of Great Seljuk 1086–1087
 Qasim ad-Dawla Abu Said Aq Sunqur al-Hajib 1087–1094
 Abu Sa'id Taj ad-Dawla Tutush I (second time) 1094–1095
 Fakhr al-Mulk Ridwan 1095–1113
 Tadj ad-Dawla Alp Arslan al-Akhras 1113–1114
 Sultan Shah 1114–1123
To the Artuqids

Sultans/Emirs of Damascus:
 Aziz ibn Abaaq al-Khwarazmi 1076–1079
 Abu Sa'id Taj ad-Dawla Tutush I 1079–1095
 Abu Nasr Shams al-Muluk Duqaq 1095–1104
 Tutush II 1104
 Muhi ad-Din Baktāsh (Ertaş) 1104
Damascus seized by the Burid Toghtekin

Seljuk sultans of Rum (Anatolia)

The Seljuk line, already having been deprived of any significant power, effectively ended in the early 14th century.

 Kutalmish 1060–1077
 Suleyman I (Suleiman) 1077–1086
 Dawud Kilij Arslan I 1092–1107
 Malik Shah 1107–1116
 Rukn ad-Din Mesud I 1116–1156
 Izz ad-Din Kilij Arslan II 1156–1192
 Ghiyath ad-Din Kaykhusraw I 1192–1196
 Suleyman II (Suleiman) 1196–1204
 Kilij Arslan III 1204–1205
 Ghiyath ad-Din Kaykhusraw I (second time) 1205–1211
 Izz ad-Din Kaykaus I 1211–1220
 Ala ad-Din Kayqubad I 1220–1237
 Ghiyath ad-Din Kaykhusraw II 1237–1246
 Izz ad-Din Kaykaus II 1246–1260
 Rukn ad-Din Kilij Arslan IV 1248–1265
 Ala ad-Din Kayqubad II 1249–1257
 Ghiyath ad-Din Kaykhusraw III 1265–1282
 Ghiyath ad-Din Mesud II 1282–1284
 Ala ad-Din Kayqubad III 1284
 Ghiyath ad-Din Mesud II (second time) 1284–1293
 Ala ad-Din Kayqubad III (second time) 1293–1294
 Ghiyath ad-Din Mesud II (third time) 1294–1301
 Ala ad-Din Kayqubad III (third time) 1301–1303
 Ghiyath ad-Din Mesud II (fourth time) 1303–1307

Gallery

Family tree

See also
 List of Sunni Muslim dynasties
 Seljuk Empire
 Seljuk Sultanate of Rum
 Seljuk (warlord)
 Сельджуки сериал на русском

References

Further reading
 
 
 Peacock, A.C.S., Early Seljuq History: A New Interpretation; New York, NY; Routledge; 2010
 
 

 
First Crusade
History of Nishapur
Maturidis